Shiva Balak Misra is an Indian geologist, writer and social worker from Barabanki district of Uttar Pradesh in India and is known for his contribution to the knowledge of earliest life forms on earth.

In 1968, Misra made the discovery of Ediacaran fossils attributed as the oldest multicellular life on Earth, The area of the formation containing the fossils was protected as the Mistaken Point Ecological Reserve in 1984, and declared a World Heritage Site by UNESCO in 2016. The fossils were later named after Misra in 2007 as Fractofusus misrai.

In 1969, Misra returned from Canada after completing his MS Degree and established a school near his native village Deora in Barabanki district in India and continues to serve this school until today.

Early education 
Misra grew up in a small village called Deora near Lucknow in Northern India, and had to walk 12 Kilometers (8 miles) to the nearest school as a child. Brought up in hardships, he completed his Higher Secondary Certificate education from Lucknow.

Fossil discovery at Mistaken Point 
Misra received a scholarship to pursue a Masters in Science from Memorial University of Newfoundland in Canada. Misra was first to prepare and present a systematic geological map of the region, to classify and describe the rock sequence of the area and to work out the depositional history of the rocks.

During this geological mapping, in the summer of 1967, he discovered a rich assemblage of imprints of soft-bodied organisms on the surface of large rock slabs in the Conception Group of Avalon Peninsula of Newfoundland at Mistaken Point. These were unusual impressions of previously unknown soft-bodied sea animals on the surfaces of Argillite (mudstone) included Coelenterates and other Metazoa of the Ediacaran.

The discovery was reported in 1968 in a paper in Nature. Later, Misra described the Mistaken Point Fauna in more detail in 1969, in another paper published in the Bulletin of the Geological Society of America. He described the fossil assemblage into groups namely:

 Spindle-shaped
 Leaf-shaped
 Round lobate
 Dendrite like
 Radiating

Social work 

After completing his master's degree, remembering the hardships he had undergone, Misra decided to return to India and establish a village school with support from his wife Nirmala Misra, a Teacher by profession.

He served as professor of geology and dean science at the Kumaun University in Nainital and after retirement from this position again joined his wife Nirmala Misra in serving. After retirement, he also serves as Editor-in-chief of  a rural news paper.

In his 80s, Misra resides in Lucknow with his wife. His eldest son Neelesh Misra is a well known Indian journalist, author, radio storyteller, Bollywood scriptwriter, and lyricist.

Awards 
Misra was awarded the Laadli Media Award for writing on gender sensitivity in 2014. Misra was also recognized with the Apeejay India Volunteer Award in 2011.

Books authored 
Misra has authored two books:
 Dream Chasing, One Man's Remarkable, True Life Story. 
 Nature & Indian-ness (भारतीयता और पयार्वरण)

References 

Indian geologists
Scientists from Lucknow
Living people
1940 births